Le Jardin des Modes was a French language women's fashion magazine published monthly in France between 1922 and 1997.

History and profile
The magazine was first published in April 1922 as L'Illustration des Modes and aimed to a cutting edge group of fashion passionates. The founders were Lucien Vogel and his brother-in-law Michel de Brunhoff. It offered a mix of beautiful illustrations, pattern making examples and cooking recipes. In 1923 the magazine was acquired by Condé Nast.

From June 1940 until September 1944 during the German occupation the magazine stopped being published. In the 1950s the magazine took the lead, making it the reference for ready to wear. Its title changed to Jardin des Modes during this period.

In 1954 the publishers Hachette bought it out and Jacques Moutin (from 1948 till 1961) becomes the creative director. A number of then unknown but soon to be famous photographers like Frank Horvat (from 1957), Jeanloup Sieff (from 1959), and Helmut Newton (from 1961) were published there. 

Due to a severe financial crisis in the late 1960s, the magazine stopped being published in 1971. From 1977 to 1979 it was published again, with Milton Glaser as the art director.  Jardin des Modes was a reference for the haute couture and ready to wear trends as well as being the place to find news about fashion, photography, design, architecture and art until 1997 when it ceased publication.

References

External links
Jardin Des Modes Official website

1922 establishments in France
1997 disestablishments in France
Defunct Condé Nast magazines
Defunct magazines published in France
French-language magazines
Monthly magazines published in France
Women's magazines published in France
Magazines established in 1922
Magazines disestablished in 1997
Women's fashion magazines